Brian T. Smith is an American Democratic Party politician currently serving as a member of the Connecticut House of Representatives from the 48th district, which includes part of the towns of Colchester, Lebanon, Mansfield, and Windham since 2020. Smith was first elected in January 2020 in a special election over Republican Mark DeCaprio. Smith was re-elected later that year over Republican Julie Shilosky. Smith currently serves as a member of the Higher Education and Employment, Planning and Development, and Transportation Committees.

References

External links

Living people
Democratic Party members of the Connecticut House of Representatives
People from Colchester, Connecticut
21st-century American politicians
Central Connecticut State University alumni
Year of birth missing (living people)